Our World: Fallen is the third studio album from American Christian rapper Flame, released on April 17, 2007.

Music video
A music video was made for the song "Goodness to Repentance".

Track listing
Our World Fallen
Where God Placed You
Shinin’ featuring Tedashii
MySpace featuring Diamone
Fallen World (interlude 1)
Goodness to Repentance
Call Him
When You Step featuring Da’ T.R.U.T.H.
World View
Fallen World (interlude 2)
Bad Ain't Good featuring Trubble
We Apologize
Desires in Conflict feat. Tony & UnderFive
Heart Stops
Come to Christ (interlude 3)
Goodbye featuring J.R. & J'son

References

External links
 Official Website "Our World Fallen"
 

2007 albums
Flame (rapper) albums
Cross Movement Records albums
Albums produced by DJ Official